Rasulpur is a village in Pakistan.  Jalalpur Bhattian located on its road leads to Hafizabad.It has an area of around 2700 to 3000 Acres and Population of around 8000.It have boys and girls school.Health care center is also in working condition with a basic laboratory including X-Ray machine.Mostly agriculture is the main profession along with Rice mills and some middle man business owners. Buffaloes goats cows are the main live stocks some horses as well.The village has mobile towers internet facility provided by PTCL exchange.Bank facility is also available UBL bank.The village provides finest rice and wheat crops in Punjab.Kabaddi Volley ball and cricket are the main sports.There are more than two to three dozens of building older than 100 years.Tarar caste is holding the most land of the village far before the partition of indo Pak

Hafizabad District
Villages in Hafizabad District